The 1928–29 Montreal Maroons season was the 5th season for the National Hockey League franchise.

Offseason

Regular season

Final standings

Record vs. opponents

Playoffs
The Maroons didn't qualify for the playoffs

Schedule and results

Player stats

Regular season
Scoring

Goaltending

Note: GP = Games played; G = Goals; A = Assists; Pts = Points; +/- = Plus/minus; PIM = Penalty minutes; PPG = Power-play goals; SHG = Short-handed goals; GWG = Game-winning goals
      MIN = Minutes played; W = Wins; L = Losses; T = Ties; GA = Goals against; GAA = Goals against average; SO = Shutouts;

Awards and records

Transactions

See also
1928–29 NHL season

References

External links

Montreal
Montreal
Montreal Maroons seasons